Hawk Littlejohn (June 12, 1941 – December 14, 2000) was a Native American flute maker. At the time of his death, he was living in Old Fort, North Carolina, where he made his flutes and sustained Cherokee traditions. His expertise in Native American medicine afforded him a position as adjunct professor at the University of North Carolina at Chapel Hill's medical school, and as a cultural consultant for the Smithsonian Institution and the North Carolina Museum of History.  He also wrote essays on Cherokee life, traditions, spirituality, and medicine in a column called "Good Medicine" for the Keetoowah Journal.  An important aspect of Hawk's spirituality was his commitment to environmentalism and the connectedness of all life.  The flute was his connection with the past and the future, and he combined historical and modern methods in its making.  Like many flute makers, Hawk often used dead wood or scrap wood, especially due to the quality of wood in the wild and of old growth wood used in the old buildings.  He used a modern lathe to shape the flute, but burned the holes in the traditional fashion with heated steel rods. His flutes are collected and played by flutists all over the world. Many flute makers find inspiration from Hawk Littlejohn's nature-themed symbolic flute designs and original hand-carved details.

Hawk Is the father of five children. Three daughters and two sons. Starting from oldest to youngest, Sondra Kay LittleJohn, Kimberly Evelyn LittleJohn, Bo Hook Snyder LittleJohn, Joshua Snowhawk LittleJohn, Beth Risingfawn LittleJohn.

Hawk Littlejohn's flute-carving art and documentation

Films
Songkeepers (1999, 48 min.).  Directed by Bob Hercules and Bob Jackson.  Produced by Dan King.  Lake Forest, Illinois: America's Flute Productions.  Five distinguished traditional flute artists - Tom Mauchahty-Ware, Sonny Nevaquaya, R. Carlos Nakai, Hawk Littlejohn, Kevin Locke – talk about their instrument and their songs and the role of the flute and its music in their tribes.

References

Eastern Band Cherokee people
Native American flautists
1941 births
2000 deaths
People from McDowell County, North Carolina
Musicians from North Carolina
Native American flute players
20th-century American musicians
20th-century Native Americans
20th-century flautists